Bruce Manson and Brian Teacher won in the final 7–6, 6–2 against Terry Moor and Eliot Teltscher.

Seeds

Draw

Final

Top half

Bottom half

References
 1981 Grand Marnier Tennis Games Doubles Draw

Grand Marnier Tennis Games Doubles